Since 1991, some members of punk band Green Day have branched out past their "main band" and have started other projects with other musicians and have released full-length albums and several EPs. Notable related projects of Green Day include Billie Joe Armstrong's Pinhead Gunpowder (which also featured Green Day's other guitarist Jason White), The Frustrators in which Mike Dirnt plays bass, and The Network which many speculate has all three members of Green Day, although under stage names.

Pinhead Gunpowder

Since 1991, Billie Joe Armstrong has been a member of Pinhead Gunpowder, providing guitars and vocals along with Jason White. Musician and Zine writer Aaron Cometbus (drums, lyrics), Green Day road manager Bill Schneider (bass), round out the lineup. Primarily a "studio only" type of side-project, the band has done a scant few rare shows, the last one occurring on February 12, 2010, at 924 Gilman Street in Berkeley, California. .
The band's latest release was 2008's West Side Highway EP on Recess Records.

The Frustrators

Mike Dirnt also plays bass for the band The Frustrators, who are signed to Billie Joe's Adeline Records. They have two releases on the label, the Bored in the USA EP and their first full-length album Achtung Jackass. Dirnt has a Frustrators sticker on his bass that is very visible in Green Day's more recent videos, as does Billie Joe on his Fernandes Stratocaster Copy. Other members of the band are Jason Chandler (lead vocalist), Terry Linehan (guitar, vocals), and Art Tedeschi (drums). All of the members are from other bands, Linehan from Waterdog, Chandler and Tedeschi from Violent Anal Death, and Dirnt from Green Day.

The Network

Formed in the Summer of 2003, The Network was a new-wave band consisted of lead vocalist Fink, bassist Van Gough, and drummer The Snoo, as well as additional members Z and Captain Underpants on keyboards and rhythm guitarist Balducci. They claimed they were "brought together by an ancient prophecy".

The band's debut album Money Money 2020 was released in September 2003 on Green Day singer Billie Joe Armstrong's record label Adeline Records. The Network concealed their identities by using accents and wearing masks.  They frequently released press statements denouncing Green Day. In October 2005, the group opened for Green Day for several shows. After this, they became inactive. After a 15-year hiatus, the band became active again in 2020, releasing a follow-up album titled Money Money 2020 Part II: We Told Ya So! in December 2020.

Armstrong denied the involvement of any Green Day members in The Network, although the members are cited as songwriters for Money Money 2020 by the group's publisher. Additionally, several journalists noted the band's vocals were unmistakably that of Armstrong. In a 2013 interview, bassist Mike Dirnt finally revealed that the group was in fact Green Day, mentioning that Money Money 2020 was worked upon alongside other Green Day projects in the mid-00's.

Foxboro Hot Tubs

During the first week of December 2007, a MySpace profile appeared featuring a band whose lead singer's voice "unmistakably" belonged to Green Day frontman Billie Joe Armstrong. Later that week, an official website, with six downloadable mp3s, also came into fruition.

In early 2008 Green Day revealed that they are in fact, The Foxboro Hot Tubs. The band said in an e-mail to MTV-News:

Green Day drummer Tre Cool's real name is Frank Edwin Wright III, bassist Mike Dirnt is Michael Pritchard, and the Reverend Strychnine Twitch is another one of Armstrong's numerous alter egos.
Jason White and Jason Freese play in Green Day as well.

The record of the Foxboro Hot tubs is titled Stop Drop and Roll!!! and was released on May 13, 2008.

In May 2008 the band made a small spring tour with eight dates.
They supported Green Day in Manchester, England, at the MEN Arena on Halloween 2009, and played at The Garage in Islington on November 2, 2009.

The Coverups

Formed in January, 2018, The Coverups serves as an outlet for Armstrong and Dirnt to perform cover songs, mostly of classic rock and classic punk bands.  A self-dubbed bar band, they play mostly small venues, such as bars, small clubs, and outdoor block parties, often unannounced.  Besides Armstrong (lead guitar, vocals) and Dirnt (rhythm guitar, vocals) the pair are joined by touring guitarist Jason White (rhythm guitar, vocals), audio engineer Chris Dugan (drums) and tour manager Bill Schneider (bass).

Stage version of American Idiot

Berkeley Repertory Theatre announced that a musical adaptation of Green Day's record American Idiot would premiere as the first production of the theater's 2009–10 season, and run from September 4 through October 11. The musical was a collaboration between Green Day and Michael Mayer (Tony Award winning director of Spring Awakening).
The musical then moved to the St. James Theatre on Broadway. Previews began on March 24, 2010, and the musical officially opened on April 20, 2010. The show closed after 422 performances on April 14, 2011. Green Day did not appear in the production, but the show had an on-stage band.
Although the entire band did not appear in the production, during the Broadway run vocalist Billie Joe Armstrong would occasionally play the role of "Saint Jimmy". 
Additionally, the Musical was nominated for three Tony Awards, including Best Musical, and won two awards for Best Scenic Design of a Musical and Best Lighting Design of a Musical.

The Longshot

In early 2018, Billie Joe Armstrong formed The Longshot with Green Day touring guitarist, Jeff Matika, as well as Prima Donna members, Kevin Preston and David S. Field. The band quietly released a self-titled EP on April 12, 2018 before releasing their debut album, Love Is for Losers, on April 20, 2018. Along with the release, Armstrong also announced a North American tour that summer.

With the formation of The Longshot, many Green Day fans began to question if Green Day had broken up. In response to fan reactions, Armstrong made a post on The Longshot's Instagram story, saying:

In addition to their debut album, The Longshot also released three EPs exclusively on SoundCloud before and after the album's release. All three EPs were later given releases on other music platforms.

Charity events and songs
 Green Day performed at the 1999 Bridge School Benefit.
 Armstrong was part of an ensemble of musicians that sang The Beatles' "Across the Universe" at the 47th Annual Grammy Awards as part of a tsunami relief production. The band also pledged to give the profits from the downloading of their song "Boulevard of Broken Dreams" to the tsunami relief fund.
 Green Day performed at the Live 8 concert on July 2, 2005, in Berlin, Germany, where they played "Holiday", "American Idiot", "Minority", and a rendition of Queen's "We Are the Champions".
 The band also contributed a prerecorded performance to the Hurricane Katrina Benefit relief event on September 10, 2005 from their performance the prior week at Gillette Stadium in Foxboro, Massachusetts. The televised portion (shown on MTV and VH1) showed the trio performing their single "Wake Me Up When September Ends".
 The band used to write songs in the People's Park, Berkeley and has generously supported Food Not Bombs (supposedly $25,000 to each of several organizations).
 On September 7, 2006, Greenday.com announced that Green Day would work with rock band U2 to record "The Saints Are Coming", originally by The Skids. The proceeds would benefit Music Rising, an organization that replaces instruments musicians lost in Hurricane Katrina's wake. The song reached number one in Ireland and number two in the UK charts.
 Green Day joined forces with the Natural Resources Defense Council to fight for the environment.
 Green Day had an auction for an autographed bike; the money is going to charity.
 Green Day covered John Lennon's song Working Class Hero on the CD Instant Karma: The Amnesty International Campaign to Save Darfur, which helped Amnesty International to focus attention on the urgent catastrophe in Darfur, Sudan. The CD was released June 12, 2007.
 Billie Joe, Jason White and their families helped to build homes in New Orleans (April 2007) and sent in daily updates to Green Day's Myspace.
 Tré Cool hosts the annual Music in Schools Today (MuST) golf tournament to benefit (San Francisco) Bay Area schools' music programs.  Mike Dirnt also participates.
 Billie Joe participated in the Stand Up to Cancer telethon which aired on several networks on September 10, 2010. Near the middle of the telethon, Billie Joe performed "Wake Me Up When September Ends", the Green Day song he wrote about his father's death from esophageal cancer.
 On September 5, 2017, Green Day performed a pre-show backstage Facebook Live stream to raise money for Hurricane Harvey relief. The show was played as a three piece. They also donated $100,000 to Americares to help Hurricane Harvey relief.

References 

Related Projects